Kahna Kacha railway station is located in Kahna Kacha village, in the Lahore district of Punjab province of the Pakistan. Pakistan Zindabad

See also
 List of railway stations in Pakistan
 Pakistan Railways

References

External links

Railway stations in Lahore District
Defunct railway stations in Pakistan
Railway stations on Karachi–Peshawar Line (ML 1)